Adam Harrington (born June 18, 1970) is an American voice actor who has appeared in various video games, often working with developers Telltale Games and Riot Games.

Harrington is most notable and recognizable for his role as Bigby Wolf, the main protagonist of The Wolf Among Us, for which he was nominated for a BAFTA Award for Best Performer.

Filmography

Video games

Live-action

References

External links
 
 

1970 births
Living people
American male film actors
American male television actors
American male video game actors
Place of birth missing (living people)
American male voice actors
21st-century American male actors